Celaenorrhinus leona, commonly known as the Sierra Leone sprite, is a species of butterfly in the family Hesperiidae. It is found in Guinea, Sierra Leone, the Ivory Coast and Ghana. The habitat consists of forests.

References

Butterflies described in 1975
leona